Cabras is a comune (municipality) in the Province of Oristano in the Italian region of Sardinia, located about  northwest of Cagliari and about  northwest of Oristano.

Cabras borders the following municipalities: Nurachi, Oristano, Riola Sardo. It is home to several churches - a parish church, in the Baroque style, and a Church of the Holy Spirit, dating to 1601 with two Gothic aisles. It is also home to the Phoenician archaeological site of Tharros.

The municipal territory includes several beaches in the Sinis peninsula and on the Gulf of Oristano.

History
Cabras appeared in the 11th century, when the town of Tharros was abandoned due to raids from North African pirates. The inhabitants first settled near the castle, scant remains of which can be seen near the parish church.

Under the Giudicato of Arborea it had some importance as the court of the giudice (duke) was held in its castle. After the fall of the giudicato, it was ruled by several feudal lords. In the 19th century it was included in the province of Oristano, until being annexed in 1859 to the province of Cagliari. Cabras returned to Oristano in 1974.

References

External links

 Official website

Cities and towns in Sardinia